The Nietzsche-Haus in Naumburg, Germany, is a building dedicated to the life and work of the German philosopher Friedrich Nietzsche.

In the summer of 1858, Nietzsche's mother, Franziska Nietzsche, moved with her two children, Elisabeth and Friedrich, to 18 Weingarten in Naumburg, the site of the Nietzsche-Haus. She rented a bright, spacious apartment on the upper floor. In 1878, she bought the house and continued to live there until her death in 1897.

Since 1994, the Nietzsche-Haus has been open to the public as a museum. In October 2010, the Nietzsche Documentation Centre opened, dedicated to research into and critical engagement with Nietzsche's works.

See also
 Nietzsche-Haus, Sils-Maria

External links 
 Official site of the Nietzsche-Haus, Naumburg

Friedrich Nietzsche
Museums in Saxony-Anhalt
Naumburg (Saale)